Dmitri Vasilyevich Klabukov (born 14 January 1980) is a Russian former football player.

External links
 
 

1980 births
Sportspeople from Izhevsk
Living people
Russian footballers
Russia under-21 international footballers
Association football defenders
Russian Premier League players
Ukrainian Premier League players
Ekstraklasa players
Russian expatriate footballers
Expatriate footballers in Belarus
Expatriate footballers in Ukraine
Expatriate footballers in Poland
FC KAMAZ Naberezhnye Chelny players
FC Shinnik Yaroslavl players
FC Volgar Astrakhan players
FC Torpedo Minsk players
FC Metalist Kharkiv players
FC Metalist-2 Kharkiv players
Zagłębie Lubin players
FC Zenit Saint Petersburg players
FC Izhevsk players